Sólo Pienso En Ti may refer to:

"Sólo pienso en ti" (Víctor Manuel song), 1979
Sólo Pienso En Ti (Lucero album), 1991
Sólo pienso en ti (Grupo Bryndis album), 2007
"Solo pienso en ti", a song by Paulo Londra from Homerun, 2019